Juliano Mineiro Fernandes (born 14 February 1986, in Rio de Janeiro), also known as Juliano Mineiro or formerly Juliano, is a Brazilian footballer.

Honours

International
Brazil
FIFA U-17 World Cup winner: 2003

Club
Chonburi F.C.
 Thai Premier League runner-up: 2014
 Thai FA Cup runner-up:2014

External links

 juventude.com

 sambafoot
 zerozero.pt
 rsssf.com
 globoesporte
 Juliano acerta com o Náutico por empréstimo
 nauticonet
 Guardian Stats Centre

1986 births
Living people
Footballers from Rio de Janeiro (city)
Brazilian footballers
Brazil youth international footballers
Brazilian expatriate footballers
J1 League players
Fluminense FC players
Esporte Clube Juventude players
Clube Náutico Capibaribe players
Esporte Clube Bahia players
C.D. Nacional players
Paraná Clube players
Primeira Liga players
Juliano Mineiro
Juliano Mineiro
Najran SC players
Kashiwa Reysol players
Expatriate footballers in Portugal
Expatriate footballers in Thailand
Expatriate footballers in Japan
Brazilian expatriate sportspeople in Portugal
Brazilian expatriate sportspeople in Thailand
Association football midfielders
Saudi Professional League players